Panther Stadium is a 5,000-seat stadium located on the campus of Clark Atlanta University in Atlanta, Georgia, United States. It was the secondary venue for field hockey events during the 1996 Summer Olympics in Atlanta. It is currently home to the Clark Atlanta Panthers, NCAA Division II member.
The athletics track surrounding the field was moved there from Centennial Olympic Stadium after the Olympic events concluded and the stadium was converted into Turner Field.

References
1996 Summer Olympics official report.  Volume 1. p. 539.
1996 Summer Olympics official report. Volume 3. p. 458.

Sports venues in Atlanta
Venues of the 1996 Summer Olympics
American football venues in Atlanta
College football venues
Clark Atlanta Panthers football
Olympic field hockey venues
College track and field venues in the United States
Athletics (track and field) venues in Georgia (U.S. state)